François-Xavier Ménage (born 27 June 1980) is a French journalist.

Biography
Xavier was born on 27 June 1980 in Brittany.

He created the television program, Capital, and currently is its host.

References

1980 births
Living people
People from Ploërmel
French television journalists
French male journalists